The Shrewsbury and Wellington Joint Railway (S&WJR) was operated by the London North Western Railway and the Great Western Railway. Its line ran from Shrewsbury (Abbey Foregate station,  not to be confused with Abbey station, also in Shrewsbury) to Wellington. Abbey Foregate also acted as a junction, with chords to Shrewsbury station and to the direct line to Wales.

Construction
Construction, between 1846 and 1849, was a joint effort between the Shropshire Union Railways (SUR) and the Shrewsbury and Birmingham Railway (S&BR).

Opening
The three companies met at Stafford Junction, Wellington.

Ownership and leasing
Upon completion of the SUR line, that company was leased to the London and North Western Railway (LNWR), and so passed to the London, Midland and Scottish Railway (LMS) on 1 January 1923; in the meantime, the S&BR was absorbed by the Great Western Railway (GWR) on 1 September 1854, and so from 1 January 1923 the S&WJR was joint GWR/LMS property.

Stations
Of the five stations of the joint line (Abbey Foregate, Upton Magna, Walcot, Admaston and Wellington) only Wellington is still open.

References

British joint railway companies
Great Western Railway constituents
London and North Western Railway
Railway lines opened in 1849
1849 establishments in England
British companies established in 1849